Kieran Paul Sadlier (born 14 September 1994) is a professional footballer who plays as a midfielder for Leyton Orient, on loan from Bolton Wanderers. He can also play at wing-back. Sadlier previously won both the League of Ireland Premier Division and FAI Cup in his first season with Cork City. Born in England, he has represented the Republic of Ireland at youth level.

Club career

West Ham United
A youth team player with Cambridge United, Sadlier joined West Ham United in 2005. After finishing top goal scorer for the U18s in their 2012–13 season, Sadlier went on to feature regularly for the U21s, he requested to be released from his contract early in January 2015 in order to sign for St Mirren until the end of the 2014–15 season.

St Mirren
Sadlier made his debut on 28 February in a 1–0 home win against Hamilton Academical coming on as a half-time substitute for Viktor Genev. He made his full home debut against Celtic on 3 April 2015 in a Good Friday evening televised game that Celtic went on to win 0–2. Sadlier scored his only goal for St Mirren in a 4–1 home victory against Kilmarnock on 25 April 2015.

Sadlier decided that he wanted to be playing back in England to be nearer to his family and left the club at the end of his contract, despite the St Mirren manager Ian Murray inviting him back for pre-season training.

Peterborough United
On 20 July 2015 Sadlier signed a contract with Peterborough United after a successful trial period. He was an unused substitute against Burton Albion and started against Charlton Athletic in the second round of the Capital One League Cup.

FC Halifax Town
On 9 October 2015 Sadlier joined FC Halifax Town, on loan from Peterborough United for three months.

Sligo Rovers
On 11 January 2016, Sadlier signed for League of Ireland Premier League side Sligo Rovers until the summer where he linked up with former manager Dave Robertson at the club, for whom he played under at Peterborough United. After 6 weeks the club wanted to retain Sadlier on a longer term contract and signed him to the club for a further 18 months; till the end of the 2017 season. Sadlier finished the 2016 season strongly, ending the season as joint top goal scorer for the club with 10 goals.

Sadlier started the 2017 season with 8 League & Cup goals (7 League & 1 EA Sports Cup) before attracting interest from three Premier League of Ireland clubs; Dundalk, Limerick & Cork City FC for his signature to join them.

Cork City
On 3 July 2017, Sadlier joined Cork City.

Having joined Cork City half-way through the 2017 season, after settling into his new club Sadlier finished the season with five goals for his new club; two goals in the League and three goals in the early rounds, together with the assist of the only goal in the semi final of the FAI Cup that saw Cork City through to the Cup Final. Cork City met Dundalk FC in the FAI Cup Final at the Aviva Stadium on 5 November 2017 where Sadlier scored the winning penalty after the game finished 1–1 in extra time.

In his second full season with the Club, Sadlier finished the season as the club's top goal scorer with 26 goals plus 13 assist, helping the club to a 2nd-place finish in the SSE Airtricity Irish Premier league, plus reach the FAI Cup final for the fourth year in a row. At the end of the season Sadlier was named in the official Irish Premier League's team of the year finishing as the league's second highest goal scorer. He was also the first person since 1974 to score in every round of the FAI Cup, including the final and only the fourth person to do this in the history of the FAI Cup.

Doncaster Rovers
In December 2018, Sadlier joined League One side Doncaster Rovers on an 18-month contract. He made his debut for Doncaster Rovers on 6 January 2019 in a third round FA Cup fixture against Preston North End  He then made his home debut in the 4th round of the FA Cup at home to Oldham Athletic on 26 January 2019. On  9 February 2019, Sadlier came on in the 68th minute to make his home league debut and scored the third goal in a 3-1 home win against his old club, Peterborough United.Sadlier left the club at the end of the 2019-20 season when the two parties were unable to agree on a new contract. In his final season at Doncaster he played 33 league games, scoring 11 goals and was their leading goal scorer.

Rotherham United
On 11 August 2020, Sadlier joined Championship club Rotherham United.

Bolton Wanderers
On 28 January 2022, Sadlier joined Bolton Wanderers for an undisclosed fee, signing a two-and-a-half year deal.

Leyton Orient
On 27 January 2023, Sadlier joined Leyton Orient on loan for the remainder of the season.

International career

Under 15 – U19s
Sadlier has played for Republic of Ireland at U15, U16, U19 and U21 levels. For the U15 side, Sadlier made two appearances, scoring on his debut against Northern Ireland U15s and was a substitute against Wales U15s, coming on for the last 20 minutes. He made four appearances for the under-16s against Czech Republic U16s (twice), Portugal U16s and Italy U16s  and played in three U17 games against Norway U17, Albania U17 and Malta U17s in the U17 Euro Championships.

For the U19 team, Sadlier made 10 appearances, starting in all 10 games, scoring one goal against Switzerland U19s in the U19 European Championship finals held in Serbia.

Under 21s
Sadlier made his Ireland U21 debut against Qatar in a friendly played in Aachen, Germany on 24 May 2014. He made four further appearances for the Irish U21s, against Germany in Leipzig, Norway U21s  on 26 September 2014  played in Drammen, Norway, both these matches were in the U21 European Championship. This was followed by a double header of friendlies against the USA & Russia U21s in which Sadlier played against Russia, both games were played in Spain.

Senior Squad
Sadlier was named in Mick McCarthy's provisional squad in October 2019 for qualifiers against the Georgian national team and the  Switzerland national team. On 29 October 2019 Sadlier was named in an extended 39-man provisional squad for a friendly against New Zealand and a qualifier against Denmark in November 2019.

Career statistics

References

External links

Living people
1994 births
People from Haywards Heath 
Republic of Ireland association footballers
West Ham United F.C. players
Association football midfielders
St Mirren F.C. players
Scottish Professional Football League players
Republic of Ireland under-21 international footballers
Republic of Ireland youth international footballers
Cambridge United F.C. players
Irish people of English descent
English people of Irish descent
Peterborough United F.C. players
FC Halifax Town players
Sligo Rovers F.C. players
Cork City F.C. players
Doncaster Rovers F.C. players
Rotherham United F.C. players
Bolton Wanderers F.C. players
National League (English football) players
League of Ireland players
English Football League players